Alejandro de la Cruz (born 23 August 1998) is a Cuban artistic gymnast.

In 2019, he represented Cuba at the Pan American Games held in Lima, Peru and he won the bronze medal in the men's vault event.

References

External links 
 

Living people
1998 births
Place of birth missing (living people)
Cuban male artistic gymnasts
Gymnasts at the 2019 Pan American Games
Medalists at the 2019 Pan American Games
Pan American Games bronze medalists for Cuba
Pan American Games medalists in gymnastics
21st-century Cuban people